Frederick William III, Duke of Schleswig-Holstein-Sonderburg-Beck (4 November 1723 – 6 May 1757) was a son of Frederick William II and his wife, Ursula Anna of Dohna. He succeeded his father as Duke of Schleswig-Holstein-Sonderburg-Beck in 1749.

Life 
Frederick William was a recipient of the Order of the Red Eagle. He served as a colonel in the Prussian Army and was commander of the Füsilier Regiments No. 46 (Old-Württemberg). During the Seven Years' War, he fell in the Battle of Prague in 1757. He was unmarried and childless; he was succeed as Duke of Schleswig-Holstein-Sonderburg-Beck by his uncle Charles Louis.

Ancestry

References 
 Gottlob Friedrich Krebel, M. Gottlieb Schumanns genealogisches Hand-Buch, S.272, 

1723 births
1757 deaths
18th-century German people
Dukes of Schleswig-Holstein-Sonderburg-Beck
Prussian military personnel of the Seven Years' War
German military personnel killed in action
Prussian Army personnel